Post is an unincorporated community in Crook County, Oregon, United States. It has a post office assigned the ZIP code of 97752. Post was named for Walter H. Post, the first postmaster of the Post post office, established in 1889.

Climate
According to the Köppen Climate Classification system, Post has a warm-summer Mediterranean climate, abbreviated "Csb" on climate maps. Snowfall amounts to an average of about  annually.

Notable residents
Author and school teacher Alice Day Pratt lived near Post on her homestead, Broadview, from 1912 through 1930.

References

Works cited

Unincorporated communities in Crook County, Oregon
Unincorporated communities in Oregon